Sir Roger Therry (22 April 1800 – 17 May 1874) was an Irish-Australian jurist and member of the New South Wales Legislative Council.

Biography

Therry was born in Cork, County Cork, Ireland and educated at Clongowes College and Trinity College, Dublin. He was called to the bar in Ireland in 1824 and in England in 1827. His A Letter to the Right Hon. George Canning on the Present State of the Catholic Question, published in 1826 (second edition 1827) probably led to his acquaintance with Canning, who employed him to edit his speeches and prepare them for publication. The Speeches of George Canning (1828) were published after Canning's death with a life of Canning written by Therry. By the influence of Canning's widow and friends Therry was appointed commissioner of the court of requests for New South Wales. and in July 1829 he sailed for Sydney, arriving in November.

Therry was a Roman Catholic, and on his arrival found that most of the Catholics were poor, and few held important positions in Sydney. The Church of England (now known as the Anglican Church) was comparatively well subsidised by the state, but very little was allowed to the Roman Catholic clergy. He endeavoured with considerable success to improve their position, and for the next 30 years held an important place amongst Catholics. He was made a magistrate in April 1830. Therry appeared as junior to Attorney General John Plunkett in the prosecution of 11 colonists charged with murder in relation to the Myall Creek massacre. In 1839 he refused appointment as an acting judge. Governor George Gipps, in a dispatch notifying this to Lord Glenelg, referred to Plunkett and Therry as the "two most distinguished barristers of New South Wales".

Therry was appointed acting attorney-general in May 1841, and at the first election for the New South Wales Legislative Council held in 1843 he was elected as the representative of the County of Camden. during this time Therry commissioned Keera Vale House, a Georgian mansion recorded as Wollongong's oldest standing house, built 1844. In December 1844 Therry was appointed to the Supreme Court of New South Wales for the District of Port Phillip and held the position as resident judge until February 1846, when he returned to Sydney as a judge of the Supreme Court of New South Wales. He visited England in 1847. Therry was nominated to the new Legislative Council on 22 May 1856, (by then the upper house of the New South Wales parliament) whilst remaining a judge of the Supreme Court. He retired on a pension in 1859, in England.

Therry's Reminiscences of Thirty Years Residence in New South Wales and Victoria was published in February 1863, and immediately withdrawn. Reviews of the book in the United Kingdom were favourable and demand was high; a second edition was proposed by the publisher. The new edition, published in April 1863, was not, however, an "expurgated version" as has been stated. Some errors were corrected, but the changes are not considerable. The most important changes were the fuller justice given to the work of three governors, Gipps, Charles Augustus FitzRoy, and Charles La Trobe, and the addition of a map. In October 1863, Therry heard about the criticism of the book in Sydney where it had become unsaleable.

Therry was one of the first members of the Senate of Sydney University.

Therry died in Bath, Somerset, England on 17 May 1874. He was survived by Lady Therry and at least three children; a son entered the army and served in India, one daughter married a British navy officer and another daughter entered Subiaco Convent, on Subiaco Creek. Therry was knighted in 1869.

See also
List of judges of the Supreme Court of New South Wales
List of Judges for the District of Port Phillip

References

External links
 

Judges of the Supreme Court of New South Wales
Members of the New South Wales Legislative Council
1800 births
1874 deaths
Australian Roman Catholics
Irish emigrants to Australia
Colony of New South Wales judges
19th-century Australian politicians
19th-century Australian judges
Alumni of Trinity College Dublin